Patrick Henry (February 12, 1843 – May 18, 1930) was a U.S. Representative from Mississippi, the uncle of Pat Henry (1861-1933).

Biography
Born near Cynthia, Mississippi, Henry attended the common schools, Mississippi College, Clinton, Mississippi, Madison College, Sharon, Mississippi, and the Nashville (Tennessee) Military College.
He moved to Brandon, Mississippi, in 1858.
He enlisted in the Confederate service as a first lieutenant in Company B, Sixth Mississippi Infantry Regiment, in 1861.
He served throughout the Civil War and surrendered at Greensboro, North Carolina, April 26, 1865, as major of the Fourteenth (Consolidated) Mississippi Regiment.
He engaged in agricultural pursuits in Hinds and Rankin Counties until 1873.
He studied law.
He was admitted to the bar in 1873 and commenced practice in Brandon.
He served as member of the Mississippi House of Representatives, representing Rankin County, from 1878-1890.
He served as delegate to the State constitutional convention in 1890.
He served as assistant United States district attorney in 1896.

Henry was elected as a Democrat to the Fifty-fifth and Fifty-sixth Congresses (March 4, 1897 – March 3, 1901).
He was an unsuccessful candidate for renomination in 1900.
He resumed the practice of law in Brandon.
He served as member of the State Senate from 1904 to 1908.
He served as mayor of Brandon from 1916 until his death in Brandon, Mississippi, May 18, 1930.
He was interred in Brandon Cemetery.

Notes

References

External links 

1843 births
1930 deaths
Mississippi College alumni
Confederate States Army officers
People from Brandon, Mississippi
People from Hinds County, Mississippi
Democratic Party members of the Mississippi House of Representatives
Democratic Party Mississippi state senators
Democratic Party members of the United States House of Representatives from Mississippi
Mayors of places in Mississippi